Choqa Janali (also Romanized as Choqā Jān‘alī; also known as Chāq Jān‘alī) is a village in Gamasiyab Rural District, in the Central District of Sahneh County, Kermanshah Province, Iran. At the 2006 census, its population was 549, in 109 families.

References 

Populated places in Sahneh County